Sulcophanaeus is a genus of beetles belonging to the family Scarabaeidae. This genus has a Neotropical distribution (Central and Southern America).

Species
Sulcophanaeus comprises five species groups (faunus, carnifex, auricollis, imperator and menelas) and about 15 valid species:
 Sulcophanaeus actaeon (Erichson, 1847)
 Sulcophanaeus auricollis (von Harold, 1880)
 Sulcophanaeus batesi (von Harold, 1868)
 Sulcophanaeus carnifex (Linnaeus, 1758)
 Sulcophanaeus chryseicollis (von Harold, 1863)
 Sulcophanaeus columbi (W.S. MacLeay, 1819)
 Sulcophanaeus faunus (Fabricius, 1775)
 Sulcophanaeus imperator (Chevrolat, 1844)
 Sulcophanaeus leander (Waterhouse, 1891)
 Sulcophanaeus menelas (Laporte de Castelnau, 1840)
 Sulcophanaeus miyashitai Arnaud, 2002
 Sulcophanaeus noctis (Bates, 1887)
 Sulcophanaeus rhadamanthus (von Harold, 1875)
 Sulcophanaeus steinheili (von Harold, 1875)
 Sulcophanaeus velutinus (Murray, 1856)

Description
They are  short and powerful dung beetles. This genus includes some particularly colorful species, many have metallic colors, others are black. Especially the males tend to have horns and outgrowths of various kinds of head and pronotum. Often male has a long, curved horns on his forehead. Pronotum is much broader than long. Elytra are short and broad with deep longitudinal wrinkles. They are diurnal, coprophagous species.

Gallery

References

 Scarabs: World Scarabaeidae Database. Schoolmeesters P.

Scarabaeidae